Journalist is a Russian magazine founded in 1914 by literary critic Vladimir Friche aimed at newsworkers. With the growing number of periodicals in pre-World War I Russia, Friche recognised the need for a publication which served the people who worked in the industry and could help to strengthen their cohesion sense of identity.

In 2004, Journalist celebrated its 90th year of operation.

References

External links
Official Website

1914 establishments in the Russian Empire
Magazines established in 1914
Russian-language magazines
Magazines about the media